

This is a list of state parks and other facilities managed by the State Parks and Recreation Department of Oregon.

The variety of locales and amenities of the parks reflect the diverse geography of Oregon, including beaches, forests, lakes, rock pinnacles, and deserts. The state parks offer many outdoor recreation opportunities, such as overnight camping facilities, day hiking, fishing, boating, historic sites, astronomy, and scenic rest stops and viewpoints. Oregon State Parks celebrated its 100 year anniversary in 2022 with events throughout the year.

Regions
The Parks and Recreation Department classifies its parks according to these regions: 
 North Coast – From the Columbia River to just south of Lincoln City
 Central Coast – From Lincoln City to Oregon Dunes National Recreation Area
 South Coast – From the Dunes NRA to California
 Willamette Valley – From the south edge of the Portland metro area south to Cottage Grove
 Southern Oregon – South of the Willamette Valley, from the coast range east through Lake County
 Portland/Columbia Gorge – Columbia County and the northern Willamette Valley and east along the Columbia River where it passes through the Cascade Range
 Central Oregon – The northern half of the high plateau Great Basin east of the Cascades
 Eastern Oregon – The eastern forty percent of the state

Photo gallery

Bibliography
Jan Bannan. Oregon State Parks: A Complete Recreation Guide, second edition. Seattle: The Mountaineers Books. 2002. 
Oregon Parks & Heritage Guide 2008. October 2007. Oregon Parks and Recreation Department.

See also 
 List of national parks in Oregon
 Lists of Oregon-related topics

Notes

External links 
 Oregon Parks and Recreation Department (official website)
 Oregon State Parks Foundation, statewide non-profit organization dedicated to state parks

Oregon
State parks